Convolvulus oxyphyllus is a species of flowering plant in the family Convolvulaceae, native to Iraq, Iran, Kuwait and Saudi Arabia. It was first described by Pierre Edmond Boissier in 1846.

References

oxyphyllus
Flora of Iran
Flora of Iraq
Flora of Kuwait
Flora of Saudi Arabia
Plants described in 1846
Taxa named by Pierre Edmond Boissier